Villers-sur-Thère is a former railway station located in the village Villers-sur-Thère near Allonne in the Oise department, France. It was served by TER Picardie trains from Paris-Nord to Beauvais. As of 2017, it is closed for passenger traffic.

See also
List of SNCF stations in Hauts-de-France

References

Defunct railway stations in Oise